The Caprock is a region in the Panhandle of Texas (USA).  It is the land to the west of the Caprock Escarpment, which separates it from plains stretching to the east at a much lower elevation.

Regions of Texas